Un Cuarto de Siglo (A Quarter of Century) (1995) is the twelfth album and third live album by Mexican rock and blues band El Tri. It records a concert held on the 25th anniversary of the bound's formation under their original name "Three Souls in My Mind". In the booklet Alex Lora thanks its followers as follows:

Track listing 
All tracks by Alex Lora except where otherwise noted.

CD 1 

 "Oye" (Listen) – 2:43 (Es lo Mejor, 1974)
 "Inyecciones" (Injections) – 3:14  (Three Souls in My Mind III, 1972)
 "San Juanico" – 6:24 (Simplemente, 1984)
 "Vicioso" (Vicious) (Lora, Sergio Mancera) – 3:06 (Simplemente, 1984)
 "Difícil" (Difficult) (Lora, Horacio Reni) – 2:51 (21 Años Después, Alex Lora y El Tri, 1989)
 "No Puedo Dejar de Chupar" (I can't quit drinking) – 3:01 (El Blues del Eje Vial, 1978)
 "Santa Martha" (Three Souls In miy Mind III, 1972) – 4:28
 "Chilango Incomprendido" (Misunderstood Chilango) – 2:59 (25 Años, 1993)
 "El Hablador" (The Bragger) (García, Lora) – 3:54 (25 Años, 1993)
 "Tómate la Foto" (Take The Picture) (Lora, Felipe Souza) – 3:49 (25 Años, 1993)
 "Que Viva el Rocanrol" – 4:30 (Three Souls in My Mind III, 1972)
 "Igual Pa' Todos" (Same For Everyone) – 5:01 (Indocumentado, 1992)
 "El Semental" (The Stud) – 3:00 (Es lo Mejor, 1974)
 "El Boogie del Tri" (El Tri Boogie) – 6:15
 "La Encuerada de Avándaro" (The Naked Woman of Avandaro) – 2:59 (Three Souls in My Mind III, 1972)
 "Viejas de Vecindad" (Neighborhood's old hags) – 5:00 (Una Leyenda Viva Llamada El Tri, 1990)

CD 2 

 "Sara" (Eduardo Chico, Lora) – 4:26 (Otra Tocada Mas, 1988)
 "Tirando a Matar" (Shoot To Kill) – 4:02 (Indocumentado, 1992)
 "El Niño Sin Amor" (Chile Without Love) – 6:03 (El Niño Sin Amor, 1986)
 "Es lo Mejor" (It's The Best) – 4:00 (Es lo Mejor, 1974)
 "Presta" (Lend) – 3:50 (Qué Rico Diablo, 1977)
 "Indocumentado" (Undocumented) – 4:44 (Indocumentado, 1992)
 "FZ. 10" (Cruz, Lora) – 3:48 (Hecho en México, 1985)
 "Abuso de Autoridad" (Abuse of Power) – 2:21 (Chavo de Onda, 1973)
 "Pobre Soñador" (Poor Dreamer) (Lora, Souza) – 4:22 (25 Años, 1993)
 "Ya Me Voy" (I'm Leaving) – 3:43 (Es lo Mejor, 1974)
 "Triste Canción" (Sad Song) – 5:38  (Simplemente, 1984)
 "A.D.O." – 8:46 (Es lo Mejor, 1974)
 "No le Hagas Caso" (Don't Listen to Them) – 2:36 (Three Souls in My Mind III, 1972)
 "Chavo de Onda" (Cool Kid) – 7:43 (Chavo de Onda, 1973)

Album and year of original release inside parenthesis

Personnel 

 Alex Lora – guitar, vocals, producer, mixing
 Rafael Salgado – harmonic
 Eduardo Chico – guitar
 Pedro Martínez – drums, backing vocals
 Ruben Soriano – bass
 Chela DeLora – backing vocals, concept

Guest musicians 

 Felipe Souza – electric & rhythm guitar, mixing
 Lalo Toral – piano
 Oscar Zarate – guitar
 Gerardo Garcia – piano
 Kenny Aviles, Norma Valdez – backing vocals
 Zbigniew Paleta – violin
 Cesar Gomez, Adolfo Diaz, Jose Lopez, Chucho Lopez – brass instruments

Technical personnel 

Chuck Johnson – mixing, mixing assistant
Richard Kaplan – engineer, mixing

External links

www.eltri.com.mx
Un Cuarto de Siglo at MusicBrainz
Un Cuarto de Siglo at MusicBrainz (disc two)
[ Un Cuarto de Siglo] at Allmusic

El Tri albums
1995 live albums
Warner Music Group live albums